The third season of the stop-motion television series Robot Chicken originally aired in the United States on Cartoon Network's late night programming block, Adult Swim. Season three officially began on August 12, 2007 on Adult Swim, with "Werewolf vs. Unicorn", and ended with "Chirlaxx" on October 5, 2008, with a total of twenty episodes.

The third season was released on the Season Three: Uncensored DVD on October 7, 2008 in Region 1, January 25, 2010 in Region 2 and December 3, 2008 in Region 4.

Overview 
The third season of Robot Chicken includes many TV, movie, TV commercial, and pop culture parodies, and non-sequitur blackouts, all acted out by dolls and action figures, including parodies like, Governor Arnold Schwarzenegger investigates the illegal immigration issue with Speedy Gonzales, Slowpoke Rodriguez and Dora the Explorer, Godzilla takes a rookie out for a Training Day, The crew of Battlestar Galactica defeats the FCC threat, President George W. Bush receives a gremlin, The SWAT Team finally "gets" Sonic the Hedgehog for speeding, Big Jim tries to score, Barbie and Yasmin (of the Bratz) go head-to-head on MTV's Exposed, "Inside the Battlefield" revisits G.I. Joe's and Cobra's battle of the Weather Dominator, twenty years later, Spawn faces the Devil with his one true skill - fiddling, Michael Moore uncovers whatever happened to the girls' toys of yesteryear, Crystar the Crystal Warrior gets smoked, Wonder Woman reveals her revealing arch-enemy, She-Ra cannot get a moment of peace as Etheria is constantly under attack while she suffers from period pains, Hermey the Elf sucks at being a dentist A nerd is stuffed into a locker and into the magical and confusing land of Narnia.., The Super Friends make way for The Super Pets, Conan the Barbarian tells us "What is Best in Life" with a song, Sylar gets a new power in a Heroes parody, Bronson Pinchot and Ludacris star in the off-Broadway production of "Don’t Be Ridiculous", The government tries to contain an outbreak of cooties and when the enemies of America are on the run as President Bush becomes...Captain Texas!

Guest stars 
Many celebrities have guest starred in Robot Chicken season three they include, Sarah Michelle Gellar, Mila Kunis, Kelly Hu, Cee Lo Green, Snoop Dogg, Kristin Chenoweth, Tahmoh Penikett, Katee Sackhoff, Joss Whedon, Michelle Trachtenberg, Ginnifer Goodwin, Rachael Leigh Cook, Donald Faison, Seth MacFarlane, Hayden Panettiere, Patrick Warburton, Candace Bailey, Kevin Connolly, Rosario Dawson, Jamie Kaler, Skeet Ulrich, Masi Oka, Mark Hamill, Adrianne Palicki, Abraham Benrubi, Amy Smart, Billy Dee Williams, Matthew Lillard, Jean Smart, Alex Borstein, Nathan Fillion, Joel McHale, Robin Tunney, Emma Caulfield, George Lowe, Mark-Paul Gosselaar, Mario López, Lark Voorhies, Dennis Haskins, Dustin Diamond, Zachary Quinto, Clark Duke, Michael Chiklis, Emmanuelle Chriqui, Chris Evans, Ludacris, Julian McMahon, Master P, Matthew Wood, Linda Cardellini, John C. McGinley and Sir Mix-a-Lot.

Episodes

DVD release

References 

2007 American television seasons
2008 American television seasons
Robot Chicken seasons